The SMX Convention Center is an events venue management company which manages convention and exhibition venues. It is a subsidiary of SM Prime Holdings.

Its primary venue is the SMX Convention Center Manila in Pasay.

Venues

SMX Convention Center Manila

The SMX Convention Center Manila is an exhibition venue and is the first and main venue under the SMX Convention Center brand. It is hosted in a dedicated building within the SM Mall of Asia complex in Pasay.

Exhibition halls within SM Malls

There are other events venue under the SMX Convention Center brand all hosted inside SM Supermalls, such as SMX Convention Center Aura (SM Aura Premier), SMX Convention Center Bacolod (SM City Bacolod), SMX Convention Center Davao (SM Lanang Premier), and SMX Convention Center Olongapo (SM City Olongapo Central).

SMX also manages the Megatrade Hall at SM Megamall, the Cebu Trade Hall at SM City Cebu and the Sky Hall Seaside Cebu at SM Seaside City Cebu.

Future venues
There are plans to open new SMX venues in Santa Rosa, at SM City Clark, and at SM City Iloilo in Iloilo City.

References

Companies based in Pasay
Philippine companies established in 2007
2007 establishments in the Philippines
SM Prime